Mohammad Firdaus bin Kasman (born 24 January 1988) is a Singapore international footballer who plays as a midfielder for Tampines Rovers in the Singapore Premier League.

Club career

Tampines Rovers
Firdaus began his professional football career with Tampines Rovers in the S.League in 2007. He left the club in 2008 and return in 2009.

Young Lions
In 2008, Firdaus signed for Young Lions.

Home United
In 2010, Firdaus signed for Home United.

Return to Tampines Rovers
Firdaus returned to Tampines Rovers for the 2011,  2012 S.League  and 2013 S.League season after joining Home United in 2011 and LionsXII in 2012

LionsXII
In December 2011, the FAS announced that Firdaus was to join the newly formed LionsXII for the 2012 Malaysia Super League. He was on loan by LionsXII in 2014 after joining Tampines Rovers in 2013. He later joined LionsXII permanently in 2015.

Young Lions
After LionsXII was disbanded, Firdaus signed for Young Lions in 2016, although he was overaged together with Khairul Amri.

Warriors
Firdaus signed for the Warriors in 2017.

Geylang International
Firdaus signed for Geylang International in 2019, and left at the end of the 2021 Singapore Premier League season

Tampines Rovers 
Firdaus once again returned to Tampines Rovers for the 2022 Singapore Premier League season, following the end of his contract at Geylang International.

Honours

International Statistics

International caps

Singapore
AFF Championship: 2012

Controversy
In 2012, Firdaus was fined by the Football Association of Singapore for allegedly being involved in a theft incident on 4 February at Clarke Quay.

References

External links

Living people
1988 births
Singaporean footballers
Singapore international footballers
Association football midfielders
Tampines Rovers FC players
Home United FC players
LionsXII players
Singapore Premier League players
Malaysia Super League players
Young Lions FC players
Footballers at the 2010 Asian Games
Singaporean people of Malay descent
Asian Games competitors for Singapore